The 2019 Western Athletic Conference baseball tournament took place beginning on May 22 and ending on May 25 or 26. The top six regular season finishers of the league's ten teams met in the double-elimination tournament to be held at Hohokam Stadium, spring training home of the Oakland Athletics in Mesa, Arizona. The winner, Sacramento State, earned the Western Athletic Conference's automatic bid to the 2019 NCAA Division I baseball tournament.

Seeding and format
The top six finishers from the regular season were seeded based on conference winning percentage.

Bracket

Conference championship

References

Tournament
Western Athletic Conference Baseball Tournament
Western Athletic Conference baseball tournament